The non-marine molluscs of Nigeria are a part of the molluscan fauna of Nigeria (wildlife of Nigeria).

A number of species of non-marine molluscs are found in the wild in Nigeria.

Freshwater gastropods 
Freshwater gastropods in Nigeria include:

Neritidae
 Clypeolum owenianum (Wood, 1828)
 Vitta cristata (Morelet, 1864)
 Vitta glabrata (Sowerby, 1849)
 Vitta rubricata (Morelet, 1858)

Ampullariidae
 Lanistes libycus (Morelet, 1848)
 Lanistes ovum Peters, 1845
 Pila ovata (Olivier, 1804)
 Pila wernei (Philipi, 1851)

Thiaridae
 Melanoides tuberculata (O. F. Müller, 1774)
 Pachymelania aurita (Müller, 1774)
 Pachymelania byronensis (Wood, 1828)
 Pachymelania fusca (Gmelin, 1791)

Pachychilidae
 Potadoma freethi (Gray, 1831)
 Potadoma liberiensis (Schepman, 1888)
 Potadoma moerchi (Reeve, 1859)

Hydrobiidae
 Potamopyrgus ciliatus (Gould, 1850)

Assimineidae
 Assiminea hessei O. Boettger, 1887

Bithyniidae
 Gabbiella africana (Frauenfeld, 1862)
 Gabbiella tchadiensis Mandahl-Barth, 1968

Viviparidae
 Bellamya unicolor (Olivier, 1804)

Planorbidae
 Africanogyrus coretus (de Blainville, 1826)
 Amerianna carinata (H. Adams, 1861)
 Biomphalaria camerunensis (C.R. Boettger, 1941)
 Biomphalaria pfeifferi (Krauss, 1848)
 Bulinus camerunensis Mandahl-Barth, 1957
 Bulinus forskalii (Ehrenberg, 1831)
 Bulinus globosus (Morelet, 1866)
 Bulinus jousseaumei (Dautzenberg, 1890)
 Bulinus senegalensis O. F. Müller, 1781
 Bulinus truncatus (Audouin, 1827) - synonym: Bulinus rohlfsi Clessin
 Bulinus umbilicatus Mandahl-Barth, 1973
 Ferrissia sp.
 Gyraulus costulatus (Krauss, 1848)
 Indoplanorbis exustus (Deshayes, 1834)
 Pettancylus eburnensis (Binder, 1957)
 Segmentorbis sp.
 Segmentorbis angustus (Jickeli, 1874)

Lymnaeidae
 Radix natalensis (Krauss, 1848)

Physidae
 Aplexa waterloti (Germain, 1911)
 Physa marmorata Guilding, 1828

Potamididae
 Tympanotonos fuscatus (Linnaeus, 1758)

Ellobiidae
 Melampus liberianus H. & A. Adams, 1854

Land gastropods 
Land gastropods in Nigeria include:

Succineidae
 Quickia sp.

Achatinidae
 Achatina achatina Linnaeus, 1758
 Archachatina marginata (Swainson, 1821)
 Archachatina papyracea (L. Pfeiffer, 1845)
 Lignus sp.
 Limicolaria aurora (Jay, 1839)
 Limicolaria flammea (Müller, 1774)

Aillyidae
 Aillya camerunensis Odhner, 1927

Euconulidae
 Afropunctium seminium (Morelet 1873)

Streptaxidae
 Costigulella mfamosingi Oke, 2013
 Edentulina liberiana (I. Lea, 1840)
 Ennea nigeriensis de Winter & de Gier, 2019
 Gonaxis camerunensis (d'Ailly, 1896)
 Gulella egborgei Oke, 2013
 Gulella gemma (d'Ailly, 1896)
 Gulella io Verdcourt, 1974
 Gulella monodon (Morelet, 1873)
 Gulella obani Oke, 2007
 Gulella odietei Oke, 2013
 Gulella ogbeifuni Oke, 2013
 Gulella opoboensis H.B. Preston, 1914
 Gulella pupa (Thiele, 1911)
 Gulella reesi H.B. Preston, 1914
 Ptychotrema aequatoriale Pilsbry, 1919
 Ptychotrema gelegelei Oke, 2004
 Ptychotrema okei de Winter, 1996
 Ptychotrema shagamuense (O.C. Oke & Odiete, 1996)
 Streptostele musaecola (Morelet, 1860)

Subulinidae
 Curvella feai J. Germain, 1915
 Curvella ovata (Putzeys, 1899)
 Curvella sp.
 Pseudopeas sp. 1
 Subulina sp. 1
 Subulina sp. 2
 Subulina involunta
 Subulina striatella (Rang, 1831)
 Subulona sp.
 Subulona pattalus H.A. Pilsbry, 1906

Helicarionidae
 Kaliella sp.
 Thapsia sp.
 Trochozonites talcosus (Gould, 1850)
 Trochozonites sp. 1

Urocyclidae
 Thapsia oscitans (M. Connolly, 1925)

Freshwater bivalves
Freshwater bivalves in Nigeria include:

Iridinidae
 Aspatharia chaiziana (Rang, 1835)
 Aspatharia dahomeyensis (Lea, 1859)
 Chambardia rubens (Lamarck, 1819)
 Chambardia wahlbergi (Krauss, 1848)
 Chambardia wissmanni (von Martens, 1883)
 Mutela rostrata (Rang, 1835)
 Pleiodon ovatus (Swainson, 1823)

Sphaeriidae
 Eupera ferruginea (Krauss, 1848)
 Pisidium pirothi Jickeli, 1881
 Sphaerium hartmanni (Jickeli, 1874)

Etheriidae
 Etheria elliptica Lamarck, 1807

Unionidae
 Coelatura aegyptiaca (Cailliaud, 1827)

Cyrenidae
 Corbicula fluminalis (Müller, 1774)

See also
Lists of molluscs of surrounding countries:
 List of non-marine molluscs of Benin, Wildlife of Benin
 List of non-marine molluscs of Chad, Wildlife of Chad
 List of non-marine molluscs of Cameroon, Wildlife of Cameroon
 List of non-marine molluscs of Niger, Wildlife of Niger

References

Further reading 
 Alohan F. I. & Oke O. C. (2004). "A preliminary investigation on the diversity and abundance of land molluscs in Okomu National Park, Edo State Nigeria". Journal of Applied and Basic Science 2: 77-81.
 Betterton C. (1984). "Spatiotemporal distributional patterns of Bulinus rohlfsi, B. forskalii and B. senegalensis in newly irrigated areas in northern Nigeria". Journal of Molluscan Studies 50: 137-152.
 Betterton C., Fryer S. E. & Wright C. A. (1983). "Bulinus senegalensis (Mollusca: Planorbidae) in northern Nigeria". Annals of Tropical Medicine and Parasitology 77: 143-149.
 Oke O. C. (2007). "Land snail diversity in a patch of cocoa plantation in Erin-Ijesha Hills, Osun State Nigeria". African Scientist 8: 61-68.
 Oke O. C. & Alohan F. I. (2004). "A new species of Streptaxidae (Mollusca: Gastropoda: Pulmonata) from Gelegele Forest Reserve, Edo State, Nigeria". African Zoology 39: 1157-1158.
 Oke O. C. & Alohan F. I. (2004). "Land snail diversity in a patch of rainforest in Cross river National Park: high species richness abundance and heterogeneity". Nigerian Journal of Applied Science 22: 166-173.
 Oke O. C. & Alohan F. I. (2006). "The land snail diversity in a square kilometre of tropical rainforest in Okomu National Park, Edo State, Nigeria". African Scientist 7: 135-142.
 Oke O. C., Alohan F. I. & Abhulimen W. (2007). "Land snail diversity in a threatened limestone formation in Odukpani, Cross River State, Nigeria". Global Journal of Pure and Applied Sciences 13: 487-492.
 Oke O. C., Alohan F. I. & Edosomwan E. U. (2007). "Land snail diversity and abundance in a patch of secondary tropical rainforest in Ekpoma, Edo State, Nigeria". African Scientist 8: 55-60.
 Oke O. C., Alohan F. I. & Ejiofor A. C. (2000). "Diversity of land molluscs in the tropical rainforest of Erin-Ijesha and Oban Hills in southern Nigeria". Journal of Environment, Science & Health 3: 6-11.
 Oke O. C. & Odiete W. O. (1996). "New species of land molluscs from south western Nigeria I. A new species attributed to Ptychotrema (Mollusca, Gastropoda)". Journal of African Zoology 110: 99-104.
 Oke O. C. & Ugiagbe O. O. (2007). "Land snail diversity in a patch of cocoa plantation in Usen, Edo State, Nigeria". Global Journal of Pure and Applied Sciences 13: 481-485.
 Preston H. B. (1914). "Characters of three new species of Ennea from southern Nigeria". Proceedings of the Malacological Society, London 11: 134-136.

Invertebrates of West Africa

Moluscs
Nigeria
Nigeria